Volker B. Heinrich is a German naturalist.

He studied horticultural sciences at the Technical University of Munich. A self-confessed "nepenthophile", he is a carnivorous plant enthusiast.

Heinrich has settled in the Philippines with his wife and family and operates the largest dedicated carnivorous plant nursery of the Philippines - the Pitcher Plant Farm. His interest in Nepenthes and his knowledge of possible pitcher plant sites have made him a regular member of expeditions in the country in recent years. He is the co-discoverer and co-describer of several new Nepenthes species, including N. attenboroughii, N. hamiguitanensis, and N. micramphora.

References

External links
 Pitcher Plant Farm - About us

21st-century German botanists
German naturalists
Living people
Technical University of Munich alumni
Year of birth missing (living people)